Salam Park, also known as Salam Family Park, is a hobby farm-turned urban park in the former Migrin neighborhood of Riyadh, Saudi Arabia. Popular for its 3.3 hectares large artificial lake and 1-km long pedestrian track, it was jointly designed by Omrania and Associates and Michael Aukett's multi-disciplinary company Aukett Associates. 

Prior to its inauguration in 2004, it was once a private property of Prince Abdullah bin Abdul Rahman al-Saud, the elder half-brother of King Abdulaziz and is today considered among the most popular places for recreation in the country's capital.

References 

Parks in Riyadh
2004 establishments in Saudi Arabia
Parks established in 2004
Urban public parks